Kings Heath Boys is a boys' community school located in Kings Heath, south Birmingham, England. It has a comprehensive admissions policy, and in 2019 had an enrolment of 582 pupils ages 11–16.

The current headteacher is Mr Christopher Etheridge. In 2013 it received a rating of "Good" (grade 2) from Ofsted, improving from "Satisfactory" (grade 3) at its previous inspection. In 2017, in a shorter inspection the school had maintained its "good" rating. "The leadership team has maintained the good quality of education in the school since the last inspection."

References

External links
 
 News Article reviewing school https://www.birminghammail.co.uk/news/local-news/kings-heath-boys-7536117

Boys' schools in the West Midlands (county)
Educational institutions with year of establishment missing
Secondary schools in Birmingham, West Midlands
Community schools in Birmingham, West Midlands